Shahab ol Din (also Romanized as Shahāb ol Dīn, Shahāb ed Dīn and Shahāb od Dīn) is a village in Qareh Toghan Rural District, in the Central District of Neka County, Mazandaran Province, Iran. At the 2006 census, its population was 576, in 158 families.

References 

Populated places in Neka County